Grace Longwell Coyle (1892–1962) was a highly influential American thinker in the area of social work with groups. She wrote important books on the subject, and had great influence on the development of teaching group work concepts.

Life

Grace Longwell Coyle was born in North Adams, Massachusetts in 1892. Her parents were John Patterson Coyle, a Congregational minister, and Mary Cushman Coyle. Her brother, David Cushman Coyle (1887–1969) wrote popular books on economics and public policy, and was appointed to Franklin D. Roosevelt's "Brain Trust". She graduated from Drury High School in 1910.
 
Grace Coyle received her bachelor's degree in 1914 from Wells Lake College. She won a scholarship from the College Settlement Association to attend the New York School of Philanthropy in 1915, where she studied social work and earned a diploma in 1915. She worked as a volunteer at a Boston settlement house while at college.
From 1915–1917, Coyle was a settlement house worker in the coal mining region of northeast Pennsylvania, dealing with new immigrants and factory workers. From 1917–18 she was a field worker with the YWCA in Pittsburgh.
From 1918–1926, she was industrial secretary for the YWCA national board in New York City. In this role she was responsible for development of education and recreation programs for adult women in industrial jobs. In 1923 she developed one of the first group work courses at the School of Applied Social Sciences of Western Reserve University, Cleveland. Later, she earned a master's degree in economics in 1928 and a doctoral degree in sociology from Columbia University in 1931. Her doctoral thesis Social Progress in Organized Groups was published as a book in 1930.

She is known for her development of the scientific approach to group work practice. Her work, teaching, and writing experiences were related to her interest in group work.  She became interested in the way that small groups function.

From 1930–34, she was head of the YWCA national laboratory division, directing research. In the summer of 1934 Coyle organized a two-week group work institute for forty YWCA and settlement house workers at Fletcher Farm School in Vermont. Grace Coyle taught from 1934 to 1962 at the School of Applied Social Sciences in Western Reserve University. In 1940 she became president of the National Conference of Social Work. Coyle was an advocate of expanding government services to reduce social problems. In 1942 she was appointed to the federal War Relocation Authority.
In 1942 she was made president of the American Association of Social Workers. She was president of the Council on Social Work Education from 1958 to 1960.

Grace Coyle was in a long-term relationship with YWCA secretary and author Abbie Graham.

Concepts

Grace Coyle made a major contribution through her speeches and writings to acceptance of group work as a component of social work.
She felt that group work and case work were compatible and complementary, each would gain by being integrated with the other, and the result would be better service to clients.
In her view, group workers required greater awareness of issues of personality and family relationships.
Through familiarity with case work the group workers would understand the how a group experience could have therapeutic potential.
Case workers needed more understanding of group dynamics and leisure activities.
In 1935 she wrote,

Coyle said in a 1946 paper presented to the members of the American Association for the Study of Group Work at the National Conference of Social Work in Buffalo,

Works

Publications include:

The archives of Case Western University hold a collection of her manuscripts, course outlines and correspondence.

References
Citations

Sources

 

1892 births
1962 deaths
American social workers
American sociologists
American women sociologists
Wellesley College alumni
Columbia University School of Social Work alumni
Case Western Reserve University faculty
People from North Adams, Massachusetts